Guillermo Pérez Roldán (born 20 October 1969) is a former professional tennis player from Argentina.

Pérez Roldán was known particularly as a strong clay court player. He turned professional in 1986. Between 1987 and 1993, he won nine top-level singles titles. His best Grand Slam performance came at the 1988 French Open, where he reached the quarter-finals, beating Alberto Mancini, Tore Meinecke, Patrik Kühnen and Stefan Edberg on the way, before being knocked out by Andre Agassi.

Tennis career

Juniors
Pérez Roldán had an excellent junior career, winning the French Open Boys' Singles championship on his favored red clay in both 1986 and 1987 – since the open era, he is the only individual to have captured the Boys' Singles championship at the French Open more than once.

Junior Grand Slam results:

Australian Open: -
French Open: W (1986, 1987)
Wimbledon: 2R (1985)
US Open: 3R (1985)

Pro tour
He burst onto the scene as a teenager in 1988 by reaching the final of the Italian Open, where he battled Ivan Lendl in five grueling sets. Later that year, at the US Open, John McEnroe famously expressed outrage at being seeded significantly lower than Pérez Roldán, who had not yet won a match on hard courts. However, Pérez Roldán silenced critics by progressing further in the tournament than McEnroe, beating Alberto Mancini, Tore Meinecke, Patrik Kühnen and Stefan Edberg before losing to Andre Agassi. He was named Rolex Rookie of the Year in 1988, influenced no doubt by his run to the finals of the Italian Open and the quarter-finals of the French Open that year.

Pérez Roldán is currently tied for tenth on the list of most titles won by a teenager in the Open Era (five).

His career-high singles ranking was World No. 13 (in 1988), and his career prize-money earnings totalled $1,686,341. In the early 1990s, his career was hamstrung by injuries, and he finally retired from the professional tour in 1996.

Personal life
He is married to Daniela with whom he has three sons. He has alleged suffering extensive physical, mental and financial abuse during his tennis career from his coach and father Raúl Pérez Roldán.

Junior Grand Slam finals

Singles: 2 (2 titles)

Doubles: 2 (1 title, 1 runner-up)

ATP career finals

Singles: 20 (9 titles, 11 runner-ups)

Doubles: 3 (3 runner-ups)

ATP Challenger and ITF Futures Finals

Singles: 5 (4–1)

Doubles: 2 (1–1)

Performance timelines

Singles

References

External links 
 
 
 
  

Argentine male tennis players
French Open junior champions
People from Tandil
1969 births
Living people
Grand Slam (tennis) champions in boys' singles
Grand Slam (tennis) champions in boys' doubles
Sportspeople from Buenos Aires Province